The 1922–23 Yale Bulldogs men's ice hockey season was the 53rd season of play for the program but first under the oversight of the NCAA. The Bulldogs represented Yale University and were coached by Murray Murdoch in his 10th season.

Season
After narrowly missing out on an Intercollegiate title the previous year, came in the season as one of the favorites for an bid into the newly created NCAA tournament. The Bulldogs were a bit slow off the mark as they struggled to earn a win in their opening game against Brown, who were back on the ice for the first time since 1939. The Elis looked much better in their second game when they rolled to an easy victory over Colby.

Yale racked up a third early-season win but then went on an 18-day vacation over the winter break. When the team returned to the ice they looked sluggish and Army took advantage, handing the Elis their first loss of the year.

Roster

Standings

Schedule and results

|-
!colspan=12 style="color:white; background:#00356B" | Regular Season

† The game was ended 75 seconds early due to a brawl between both teams.

References

Yale Bulldogs men's ice hockey seasons
Yale
Yale
Yale